The Swiss National Cyclo-cross Championships are held annually to decide the cycling champions in the cyclo-cross discipline, across various categories.

Men

Elite

Under-23

Junior

Women

Elite

See also
Swiss National Road Race Championships
Swiss National Time Trial Championships
Swiss National Mountain Bike Championships

References

Cycle races in Switzerland
Recurring sporting events established in 1912
1912 establishments in Switzerland
National cyclo-cross championships